Several ships of the Argentine Navy have been named ARA Santa Fe after the Santa Fe Province of Argentina:

  a  launched in 1911 but sold to Greece before acceptance in 1912.
 , a  built in Italy and commissioned in 1933, which served until 1956 when it was scrapped.
 , the former , a submarine was acquired in 1960 and scrapped in 1974.
 , formerly , a submarine commissioned in 1971 and served until 1982 when she was captured by the British during the Falklands War and scuttled in 1985.
 , was a  that was never completed due to the Argentine economic crisis of the 1980s.

Argentine Navy ship names